The viral genus Cyclovirus is a genus in the family Circoviridae. Viruses in this genus have been isolated from dragonflies, as well as chickens, goats, sheep, and other farm animals. Cycloviruses have also been found in the feces of healthy humans and chimpanzees and in samples of cerebrospinal fluid from patients with unexplained paraplegia.

Species
The following species are recognized:

Ant associated cyclovirus 1
Bat associated cyclovirus 1
Bat associated cyclovirus 2
Bat associated cyclovirus 3
Bat associated cyclovirus 4
Bat associated cyclovirus 5
Bat associated cyclovirus 6
Bat associated cyclovirus 7
Bat associated cyclovirus 8
Bat associated cyclovirus 9
Bat associated cyclovirus 10
Bat associated cyclovirus 11
Bat associated cyclovirus 12
Bat associated cyclovirus 13
Bat associated cyclovirus 14
Bat associated cyclovirus 15
Bat associated cyclovirus 16
Bovine associated cyclovirus 1
Capybara associated cyclovirus
Chicken associated cyclovirus 1
Chicken associated cyclovirus 2
Chimpanzee associated cyclovirus 1
Cockroach associated cyclovirus 1
Dragonfly associated cyclovirus 1
Dragonfly associated cyclovirus 2
Dragonfly associated cyclovirus 3
Dragonfly associated cyclovirus 4
Dragonfly associated cyclovirus 5
Dragonfly associated cyclovirus 6
Dragonfly associated cyclovirus 7
Dragonfly associated cyclovirus 8
Duck associated cyclovirus 1
Feline associated cyclovirus 1
Goat associated cyclovirus 1
Horse associated cyclovirus 1
Human associated cyclovirus 1
Human associated cyclovirus 2
Human associated cyclovirus 3
Human associated cyclovirus 4
Human associated cyclovirus 5
Human associated cyclovirus 6
Human associated cyclovirus 7
Human associated cyclovirus 8
Human associated cyclovirus 9
Human associated cyclovirus 10
Human associated cyclovirus 11
Human associated cyclovirus 12
Mouse associated cyclovirus 1
Rodent associated cyclovirus 1
Rodent associated cyclovirus 2
Spider associated cyclovirus 1
Squirrel associated cyclovirus 1

References 

Circoviridae
Virus genera